The Bert Bell Award is presented by the Maxwell Football Club to the player of the year in the National Football League (NFL). The award is named in honor of Bert Bell (1895–1959), commissioner of the NFL and founder of the Maxwell Club. Voters for the Pro Awards are NFL owners, football personnel, head and assistant coaches as well as members of the Maxwell Football Club, national media, and local media. The award consists of a trophy in the form of a statue in the likeness of Bell. The award is presented at the club's annual football banquet.

Winners

See also
 National Football League Most Valuable Player Award
 List of National Football League awards

References

General
 
 

Footnotes

National Football League trophies and awards
Awards established in 1959